Shamsul Alam (born 1 January 1951) is a Bangladeshi economist, and has been the State Minister of Planning of Bangladesh since 19 July 2021. He retired as a member and the Senior Secretary of the Bangladesh Planning Commission. He is also one of the syndicate members of Sylhet Agricultural University. In recognition of his contribution in economics, the government of Bangladesh awarded him the country's second highest civilian award Ekushey Padak in 2020. He is the member of Awami league Advisory council.

Early life
Alam was born on 1 January 1951 at Matlab Uttar in Chandpur of the then East Bengal (now Bangladesh). He graduated in 1965 from the then East Pakistan Agricultural University (now Bangladesh Agricultural University) with a degree in agricultural economics and received his post-graduate degree in 1973. In 1983, he received a post-graduate degree in economics from Thammasat University and obtained his PhD in the same subject from Newcastle University in 1991.

Career
Alam served as a faculty member of Bangladesh Agricultural University during 1974–2009. He worked as a member of General Economics Division (GED) from 2009 until 30 June 2021.

Awards
 Ekushey Padak (2020)
 Economist of Influence Award (2018)
 Rebel Poet Kazi Nazrul Islam Memorial Medal (2018)

References 

1951 births
Living people
People from Chandpur District
Bangladesh Agricultural University alumni
Academic staff of Bangladesh Agricultural University
Shamsul Alam
20th-century Bangladeshi economists
Recipients of the Ekushey Padak
21st-century Bangladeshi economists